Hellvik is a village in Eigersund municipality in Rogaland county, Norway.

The village has a good natural harbour and is a popular location for holiday houses. There is a school and a kindergarten. The biggest employer in Hellvik is Hellvik Hus, which produces houses all over Norway.  Hellvik's A-level soccer team plays in the 5th division of Norway.

The Sørlandet Line (historically called the Jæren Line) runs through the village, with the Jæren Commuter Rail stopping at Hellvik Station.

References

Villages in Rogaland
Eigersund